World Cup 98 is the first official FIFA World Cup game developed by EA Sports after obtaining the rights from FIFA in 1997. Unlike the previous World Cup games, which were in 2D and showed a bird's-eye view, World Cup 98 used a 3D engine, utilising DirectX for the PC version. Accurate national team kits (except for the goalkeepers who were issued a generic kit) were introduced complete with kit manufacturer logos and official merchandise. The game engine is based on that of FIFA: Road to World Cup 98, though it features some minor gameplay improvements to areas such as in-game strategy changing and player positioning. The playable teams in the friendly mode also included several nations that did not qualify for the finals. World Cup 98 was released for Microsoft Windows, PlayStation, Nintendo 64 and Game Boy.

Game modes

The main feature of the game is the World Cup tournament itself, where the player may use either the actual groups used in the finals, or groups composed of a random selection of the 40 included teams. Each match takes place in a recreation of the venue it was played in the actual tournament. As in the real tournament, group games do not go to extra time or a penalty shootout but knockout matches do.

The game was released prior to the actual World Cup, therefore results between CPU teams are not based on results from the actual tournament. At the end of each match, a caption shows the man of the match award, and if applicable a clean sheet caption. At the end of the "World Cup" game mode, captions show the winner of the Golden Boot for most goals scored during the tournament and winner of the FIFA Fair Play Award, two awards which are given in the real World Cup.

It is also possible to play friendly matches between any of the teams that are included in the game. At the end of a drawn game the player can choose to finish the match as a draw, play extra time with the golden goal rule, or take part in a penalty shootout.

As in FIFA 98, national squads can be customised to reflect the actual tournament's players by including players from a reserves pool in the "customise" option.

The "World Cup Classics" mode allows the player to play fifteen classic FIFA World Cup matches. The 1982 match is unlocked by winning the "World Cup" mode, and by completing each unlocked game, the next one is unlocked in the order shown below. "World Cup Classics" mode features accurate period team kits (except for the goalies), hairstyles and names, and commentary for this mode only was provided by Kenneth Wolstenholme, the BBC's commentator during the 1966 and 1970 FIFA World Cup. For the 1950, 1954, and 1966 World Cup Final matches in this mode, the graphics are in black and white, as they were shown on television at the time. The 1930 and 1938 matches are shown using sepia tone graphics. In matches that took place prior to the introduction of substitutions, it is not possible to change a player during the match (however, this also applies to the 1970 final, which was when substitutions became the rule). Other historical inaccuracies include cards being awarded to players in matches prior to 1970 and the use of brown leather balls for matches from 1970 onwards, in lieu of balls like the Adidas Telstar (for 1970 and 1974) and the Adidas Tango España (for the 1982 final). The United Kingdom version of the game features commentary from John Motson and Chris Waddle, with matches introduced by Des Lynam and Gary Lineker.

Teams
The game features every team that qualified for the 1998 FIFA World Cup, as well as eight others who did not: Australia, Canada, China, Greece, Portugal, Republic of Ireland, Russia and Sweden. All teams are featured with their authentic kits.

Development
In 1996, EA Sports obtained exclusive rights to use the 1998 World Cup in video games published anywhere except Japan.

Reception

The game received favourable reviews on all platforms according to the review aggregation website GameRankings. Next Generation said of the PlayStation version, "Released to coincide with the recent World Cup frenzy, Electronic Arts' World Cup 98 is technically a winner. The game delivers fast reactions to controller commands, realistic player movement, clean graphics, an excellent soundtrack, and adrenaline-pumping excitement."

Jeff Lackey of Computer Games Strategy Plus gave the PC version all fives stars, saying, "If you don't have FIFA 98, the decision is clear—if you are a soccer fan, or any type of computer sports fan at all, you will love World Cup 98. If you have FIFA 98, the decision is a bit trickier as the improvements are subtle but significant—you will likely find the improved player and goalie AI and the wonderful recreation of the World Cup atmosphere well worth the price of admission." Warren Christmas of PC Zone gave the same PC version 91%, saying, "World Cup 98 is quite simply the finest football game on the PC; the perfect accompaniment to the tournament. Not so meat and gravy, then, as a succulent chicken in white wine sauce (or something). Gorge yourself on it." Brad Cook of AllGame gave the same PC version four stars out of five, saying, "Overall, you'll love this game if you're a soccer fan and [you] will still enjoy it even if you like sports games but aren't a big soccer player. Novice players will find it easy to play (scoring goals isn't very hard on amateur level) while experts will like the wealth of options available for them to play with." However, Edge gave the same PC version seven out of ten, saying, "Ultimately, WC '98s basic core of gameplay remains unchanged. For RTWC '98 owners, it's a purchase for the completist or the extravagant; for the uninitiated few, an opportunity to see a commercially evergreen franchise in rare form."

Cam Shea of Hyper gave the N64, PlayStation and PC versions each 90%, calling the game "a superb game, but think twice if you already own FIFA 98." James Ashton of N64 Magazine gave the N64 version 73%, calling it a "highly desirable license, [but a] flawed game."

The PlayStation version was a bestseller in the UK. At the 1999 Milia festival in Cannes, it took home a "Gold" prize for revenues above €48 million in the European Union during the previous year. PC Guide'''s July 1998 issue named World Cup 98 as the winner of a group test involving other PC football games around at the same time, ahead of competitors such as Actua Soccer 2, Three Lions and Sensible Soccer '98. The magazine described the game as "Simply the best football game in the world."

The PC version was a finalist for Computer Games Strategy Pluss 1998 "Sports Game of the Year" award, which ultimately went to Grand Prix Legends''. The staff called the game "superb, a tour de force of soccer simulation."

See also
FIFA World Cup video games
FIFA (video game series)

References

External links

World Cup 98 (video game) (YouTube)

Video Game 1998
1998 video games
World Cup 1998
Association football video games
World Cup 1998
Game Boy Color games
Nintendo 64 games
PlayStation (console) games
Sports video games set in France
Video games developed in Canada
Tiertex Design Studios games
Windows games
EA Sports games
Electronic Arts games
Video games scored by Rom Di Prisco
Video games set in 1998
Cancelled Sega Saturn games